270 may refer to:

The year 270
270 (number)
.270 Winchester, a rifle cartridge, or more generally cartridges in the .270 caliber